Major General Nawabzada Sher Ali Khan of Pataudi HJ (13 May 1913 – 29 May 2002) was a Major General in Pakistan. Born into the Pataudi family, He was the second son of Nawab Ibrahim Ali Khan, in Pataudi and his wife Shahar Bano Begum, daughter of Amiruddin Ahmad Khan, the Nawab of Loharu.

Family and background 
Sher Ali Khan Pataudi is the son of Ibrahim Ali Khan, the 7th Nawab of Pataudi from 1913 to 1917, and Shahar Bano Begum, daughter of Amiruddin Ahmad Khan, the Nawab of Loharu. Through his mother, he is related to the Urdu poet Mirza Ghalib, and the first Prime Minister of Pakistan, Nawabzada Liaquat Ali Khan.
Sher Ali Khan married Silvat Mueenuddin younger daughter of Mian Ghulam Mueenudin of Lahore, and had four sons and a daughter. He died 29 May 2002 at Sher Manzil in Lahore. One of his sons, Major General Isfandiyar Ali Khan Pataudi, was the commander of the Pakistan Army's 25th Mechanized Division and Deputy Director-General of Pakistan's premier intelligence agency, the Inter-Services Intelligence.

Career 
He was commissioned into the 7th Light Cavalry of the British Indian Army in 1933. He subsequently commanded the 1st battalion of the First Punjab Regiment during the Second World War.

After the war, he served as the Defence Attaché of the British Indian Armed Forces in Washington, D.C. Having chosen to move to Pakistan at independence, he commanded Pakistan's 14 (Parachute) Brigade during the 1947 Kashmir War in which action he was awarded the first Hilal-i-Jurat of Pakistan. He was appointed Adjutant General of the Pakistan Army and later served as the Chief of General Staff.

He was superseded along with Maj. Gen. Adam Khan and the former Commandant Command and Staff College Maj Gen M.A. Latif Khan when Maj Gen Muhammad Musa and Maj Gen Habibullah Khan Khattak were made C-in-C and COS respectively in October 1958.

In 1958, on retirement from active service, he was appointed Pakistan's High Commissioner to Malaysia and in 1963 as Ambassador to Yugoslavia with concurrent accreditation to Bulgaria and Greece. He served in the cabinet of General Yahya Khan as Federal Minister for Information, Broadcasting & and National Affairs 1969 – 71. He was a member of Pakistan's Polo team for many years, Captain of the All Malaysia Polo team for six years and President of the Malayan Polo Association 1959/1963. He also established the Djakarta Riding/Saddle club and was its first elected president. He taught briefly at Aitchison College and was also Vice Chairman of its Board of Governors. He was the co-founder and chairman of the governing body of Waqar-un-Nisa Women's College at Rawalpindi. He was the author of several books and the recipient of the highest civil awards from governments in Malaysia, Yugoslavia and Indonesia, and was a Dato of the State of Pahang in Malaysia.

Books
 Al-Qiṣaṣ: The Story of Soldiering and Politics in India and Pakistan, 1978 (third edition in 1988.)
 Quest of Identity: The Entanglement of Muslims in India and Pakistan, 1984 (second edition in 1994.)
 The Elite Minority: the Princes of India, 1989.
 Ramblings of a Tiger, 1990.

References

1913 births
2002 deaths
Ambassadors of Pakistan to Bulgaria
Ambassadors of Pakistan to Greece
Ambassadors of Pakistan to Yugoslavia
High Commissioners of Pakistan to Malaysia
Pakistani generals
Recipients of Hilal-i-Jur'at
British Indian Army officers
Indian Army personnel of World War II
Aitchison College alumni
Pakistani politicians
People from Gurgaon district
Rashtriya Indian Military College alumni
Graduates of the Royal Military College, Sandhurst
Academic staff of Aitchison College
Pakistani people of Haryanvi descent
Punjab Regiment officers